Sir John William Laing  (24 September 1879 – 11 January 1978) was a British entrepreneur in the construction industry. He inherited his father's building business – which is now known as John Laing Group – in the early 1900s.

Background
Laing was born in Carlisle to John Laing and Sarah Wood. His great-grandfather David Laing had come from Scotland to England in 1812 and lived in the Cumberland village of Sebergham. David Laing developed a family building business which prospered due to the boom in the country caused by the Franco-Prussian War of 1870. The war necessitated the construction of many new woollen mills in the local areas close to the Laings' business creating much work and a considerable growth in the value of their business. However the war time boom soon turned down and the Laings' construction business had no contracts. It was around this time that John’s mother and father converted to the Plymouth Brethren.

Career
Laing followed his father, John, into the construction business, expanding it from a local building firm to open a London office in 1926. Under his leadership, the firm became a national enterprise that culminated in the rebuilding of Coventry Cathedral, whose consecration Laing attended in May 1962.

Laing gave the company its evangelical direction, which included pioneering ideas that nurtured staff, such as paid holidays, in the early part of the 20th century.

In 1922 he gave almost 40% of his shareholding in the business to a charitable foundation. He retired from the business in 1957, was knighted in 1959 and died in 1978, aged 98.

Marriage and children
Laing married Beatrice Harland in September 1910. His sons William Kirby Laing and John Maurice Laing and his grandson Martin Laing continued the family business.

The John Laing Lectureship in the History and Theology of the Reformation was established in New College, Edinburgh, endowed by the Kirby Laing Foundation.

References

Sources

External links

1879 births
1978 deaths
People from Carlisle, Cumbria
British businesspeople
Businesspeople awarded knighthoods
Knights Bachelor
People educated at Carlisle Grammar School
Commanders of the Order of the British Empire